Sir John Emmott Barlow, 1st Baronet (16 April 1857 – 17 September 1932) was a British businessman and Liberal Party politician.

Barlow was the son of Thomas Barlow and his wife Mary Ann (née Emmott). He was educated at Windlesham House School, Grove House School, Tottenham and the University of London. He was a senior partner in the family firms of Thomas Barlow & Brothers, of Manchester and London, and Barlow and Company, of Calcutta, Shanghai, Singapore and Kuala Lumpur which traded in tea, coffee, rubber and such. He sat in the House of Commons as Member of Parliament (MP) for Frome in Somerset from 1892 to 1895 and from 1896 to 1918, and was a justice of the peace for Cheshire and Somerset and a County Alderman for Cheshire. In 1907 he was created a baronet, of Bradwall Hall in Sandbach in the County of Chester.

Barlow married the Hon. Anna Maria, daughter of Richard Denman and Helen Mary McMicking, on 13 July 1895. They had two sons and two daughters. He died in September 1932, aged 75, and was succeeded in the baronetcy by his eldest son John, who was a Conservative MP. Lady Barlow died in 1965.

Notes

References
Kidd, Charles, Williamson, David (editors). Debrett's Peerage and Baronetage (1990 edition). New York: St Martin's Press, 1990,

External links 
 
 "Barlow Collection " at Cambridge University Library

1857 births
1932 deaths
Converts to Quakerism
English Quakers
Liberal Party (UK) MPs for English constituencies
UK MPs 1892–1895
UK MPs 1895–1900
UK MPs 1900–1906
UK MPs 1906–1910
UK MPs 1910
UK MPs 1910–1918
Baronets in the Baronetage of the United Kingdom
People from Sandbach
People educated at Windlesham House School